Mohammad Moinuddin Miazi is a Bangladesh Awami League politician and the former Member of Parliament of Jessore-4.

Career
Miazi was elected to parliament from Jessore-4 as a Bangladesh Awami League candidate in 1973.

References

Awami League politicians
Living people
1st Jatiya Sangsad members
Year of birth missing (living people)
People from Jhenaidah District